Livingstone Joseph Lusinde (born 4 March 1972) is a Tanzanian CCM politician and Member of Parliament for Mtera constituency since 2010.

References

1972 births
Living people
Chama Cha Mapinduzi MPs
Tanzanian MPs 2010–2015